Bidhan Chandra College, also known as Rishra College, is present at Rishra, in the Hooghly district, West Bengal, India. It offers undergraduate courses in arts, Commerce and sciences and postgraduate courses in a few subjects. It is affiliated to University of Calcutta. It was established in 1957.

Departments

Science
 Mathematics
 Computer Science
Geography
Economics
Environmental Science

Arts and Commerce
 Bengali
 English
 Hindi
 Sanskrit
 History
 Political Science
 Philosophy
 Economics
 Education
 Commerce

Accreditation
In 2016 the college has been awarded B grade by the National Assessment and Accreditation Council (NAAC). The college is recognized by the University Grants Commission (UGC).

See also 
List of colleges affiliated to the University of Calcutta
Education in India
Education in West Bengal

References

External links
 

University of Calcutta affiliates
Educational institutions established in 1957
Universities and colleges in Hooghly district
1957 establishments in West Bengal